The Beiijing HsingHai Musical Instruments Corporation LTD. (also called Beijing Hsinghai Piano Group Limited or Beijing Xinghai Piano Group Limited, 北京星海钢琴集团有限公司), is one of the largest musical instrument manufacturers in China. Based in Beijing, the company was established on June 1, 1949. 

It produces Western instruments such as pianos and accordions as well as traditional Chinese musical instruments such as yangqin, ruan, and sheng. The company has nearly 4,000 employees and is one of China's largest manufacturers of pianos. 

They make the "Heritage" Collection for the Hallet Davis and Company, Boston (H&D) piano line. The Heritage Collection is the entry-level line for H&D, with the smallest upright pianos, and smallest grand pianos (4'7") for the H&D family. The H&D is the oldest U.S. piano name dating back to 1843 with the same name, and 1835 under the Brown and Hallet name. The H&D piano name pre-dates the second oldest U.S. piano by Weber (1852), and the third oldest by Steinway and Sons (1853).

The company's assets in 2008 were 629,000,000 Chinese yuan. 

Its area is 300,000 square meters, and its floor space is about 170,000 square meters. The company has several locations in Beijing and also maintains a conservatory.

See also
Aigo

References

External links
Official site
Official site 

Musical instrument manufacturing companies of China
Manufacturing companies based in Beijing
Chinese companies established in 1949
Manufacturing companies established in 1949